John A. Lepper (born December 22, 1934 in Attleboro, Massachusetts) is an American politician who represented the 2nd Bristol District in the Massachusetts House of Representatives from 1995–2009. He had previously served as a member of the Attleboro, Massachusetts City Council from 1987–1993.

References

1934 births
Republican Party members of the Massachusetts House of Representatives
People from Attleboro, Massachusetts
Heidelberg University (Ohio) alumni
Johns Hopkins University alumni
Georgetown University alumni
Living people